The 2005–06 ECHL season is the 18th season of the ECHL, a professional ice-hockey league based in the United States. The season ran from late October 2005 to early June 2006. The Brabham Cup regular season champions and Kelly Cup playoff champions were the Alaska Aces.

League changes
At the end of the 2004–05 season, the Pee Dee Pride and Louisiana IceGators franchises ceased operations, with the Florence-based Pride announcing a move to nearby Conway (in the Myrtle Beach area; the cities of Florence and Myrtle Beach are considered one market for television purposes) while awaiting completion of the new Atlantic Center Arena that eventually never happened. The ECHL eventually revoked the franchise at the 2009 Board of Governors meeting. The Peoria Rivermen franchise also ceased operations when the ownership acquired an AHL franchise and under the same name.

The league also approved of Barry Kemp's Ontario, California, expansion franchise rights to be transferred to play in Bloomington, Illinois, in May 2004. After an apparent fallout among the Bloomington Partners and the nearby Peoria Rivermen transferring to the AHL, the Bloomington ECHL franchise was sold to Legacy Partners, LLC, headed by Phoenix Suns' majority owner Robert Sarver and the franchise was relocated as the Phoenix RoadRunners as the only expansion team for the season.

The Atlantic City Boardwalk Bullies were sold and relocated to Stockton, California, as the Stockton Thunder. The Utah Grizzlies' new ownership also bought the former Lexington Men O' War franchise that had been dormant since 2003 after the American Hockey League's Grizzlies ceased operations.

Just prior to the start of the season, the Texas Wildcatters and the Mississippi Sea Wolves were both forced to sit out the season due to damage caused by Hurricanes Katrina and Rita. The Wildcatters were given permission to re-enter the league for the 2006–07 season, while the Sea Wolves were allowed to return for the 2007–08 season.

While most leagues adopted the entire NHL rule change package for 2005–06 (based on the 2004–05 AHL rule changes), the ECHL kept the shootout at five players, and kept the automatic icing rule which has been used in the league.

All-Star Game
The ECHL All-Star Game was held at the Save Mart Center in Fresno, California, and was hosted by the Fresno Falcons. The National Conference All-Stars defeated the American Conference All-Stars 7–6, with Fresno's Luke Curtin named Most Valuable Player.

Regular season

Final standings
Note: GP = Games played; W = Wins; L= Losses; OTL = Overtime Losses; SOL = Shootout Losses; GF = Goals for; GA = Goals against; Pts = Points; Green shade = Clinched playoff spot; Blue shade = Clinched division; (z) = Clinched home-ice advantage

American Conference

National Conference

Scoring leaders
Note: GP = Games played; G = Goals; A = Assists; Pts = Points; PIM = Penalty minutes

Leading goaltenders
Note: GP = Games played; Mins = Minutes played; W = Wins; L = Losses; T = Ties; GA = Goals allowed; SO = Shutouts; GAA = Goals against average

Kelly Cup playoffs

American Conference

Bracket

Division quarterfinals

Division semifinals

Division finals

Conference finals

National Conference

Bracket

Division semifinals

Division finals

Conference finals

Kelly Cup finals

ECHL awards

See also
 ECHL All-Star Game
 Kelly Cup

References

External links
ECHL website

 
ECHL seasons
ECHL season, 2005-06